Dr. Charles Smith Brocca was Head of Curriculum and Quality in Swansea School of Education at Swansea Metropolitan University (University of Wales), and following its merger with University of Wales Trinity Saint David was Senior Quality Manager and member of the Senior Leadership Team of the Faculty of Humanities at Swansea. He was previously Senior Lecturer in Economics at the Swansea Business School. 

Author/co-author of Economic Development (Palgrave), International Trade and Globalisation (Anforme), Revision Express Economics (Pearson-Longman)  and many academic and journalistic articles in the fields of economics and business education, devolution, regional development and European integration. 

His research specialized in comparative politics and economics of Wales and Catalonia, education, training and employment. He has also contributed to the Encyclopedia of Business in Today's World. He has often broadcast on regional television and radio in an 'expert' role on economic and political matters.

Smith gained national standing as an examiner and curriculum developer. 
During the 1990s he was a Chief Examiner with a leading international education foundation and undertook teacher training workshops and conferences in more than 20 countries spanning five continents. 
He was subsequently Chief Examiner in Economics with a major UK awarding body. He has also been a consultant for the UK government's Qualifications and Curriculum Development Agency (QCDA), an adviser to the Welsh Assembly Government (member of the Wales Employment Advisory Panel) and a member of the economic council of Britain in Europe.

Smith retired from full-time teaching in 2014, but maintained a consultancy role, particularly with international Higher Education partnerships with private sector universities run by educational foundations in Spain. He is active in politics, and was a Labour Party councillor on a South Wales unitary authority county council, where his responsibilities as a Cabinet Member included Education, Regeneration and Economic Development.

Since 2016 he has focussed on working with others towards reversing what he regards as the "Disaster of Brexit", as Chair of Bridgend for Europe, a member of the Directors and Chairs Group of Wales for Europe, and a National Council member of the European Movement UK.

He is a grandson of José Brocca, whose biography can be found on both the English and Spanish versions of Wikipedia. He says this helps explain his concern for peaceful integration in Europe.

Notes and references

Books
Smith, Charles. International Trade and Globalisation 2nd ed. Stocksfield : Anforme, 2004. Previous ed.: published as Understanding International Trade. Third edition, spring 2007. ; Fourth Edition, spring 2010; Fifth edition 2012.
Smith, Charles. Economic Development, Growth and Welfare, Basingstoke : Macmillan, 1994. 163p.  (cased).  (pbk). Second edition (with Gareth Rees) published as Economic Development, Basingstoke : Palgrave, 1998 .
Charles Smith, Matthew Smith, Ian Etherington. Revision Express Economics, Harlow : Longman Education/ Pearson, 2006. 184 pages . Second edition: 2008.

External links
Economics Network: Case study: Building-blocks of Understanding, Charles Smith
Evidence to Select Committee for Welsh Affairs
Quoted on BBC News web pages, January 2004
International Trade and Globalisation, 5th edition [https://economicsfactory.com/product/international-trade-and-globalisation/ 
Quoted in Education Guardian, 21 August 2007
Quoted in Times Educational Supplement (TES), 23 May 2009

Welsh economists
People associated with Swansea Metropolitan University
Living people
Year of birth missing (living people)